Brandau Crater is an ice-free volcanic crater lying to the south of the snout of Howchin Glacier on Chancellor Ridge, Royal Society Range. It was named by the New Zealand Geographic Board (1994) after Lieutenant Commander James F. Brandau, U.S. Navy, Squadron VX-6 helicopter pilot in the area, 1964 and 1965.

References
 

Volcanoes of Victoria Land
Scott Coast
Volcanic craters